Kitty Keene, Inc. is an old-time radio soap running from 1937 to 1941 about a female private detective. It first aired on CBS and later on Mutual. 
Kitty was played by Beverley Younger, Gail Henshaw and Fran Carlon.

Other characters, and the actors who played them, were as shown in the table below:

There are four surviving episodes.

References

External links
Kitty Keene episodes on Old Time Radio Researchers Group website

American radio soap operas
1937 radio programme debuts
1941 radio programme endings
Mutual Broadcasting System programs
CBS Radio programs